Osvaldo Horacio Codaro (9 December 1930 – 6 June 2017) was an Argentine water polo player who competed in the 1948 Summer Olympics, in the 1952 Summer Olympics, and in the 1960 Summer Olympics.

References

1930 births
2017 deaths
Argentine male water polo players
Olympic water polo players of Argentina
Water polo players at the 1948 Summer Olympics
Water polo players at the 1952 Summer Olympics
Water polo players at the 1960 Summer Olympics
20th-century Argentine people